Acinetobacter beijerinckii is a gram-negative, strictly aerobic bacterium from the genus of Acinetobacter which was isolated from human and animal specimens and from different environmental sources.

References

External links
Type strain of Acinetobacter beijerinckii at BacDive -  the Bacterial Diversity Metadatabase

Moraxellaceae
Bacteria described in 2009